Prince Igor Sviatoslavich the Brave or Ihor Sviatoslavych (Old East Slavic: Игорь Святъславичь, Igorĭ Svjatŭslavičĭ; , Igor Svyatoslavich; , Ihor Svyatoslavych; Old Norse: Ingvar Sveinaldsson) (Novhorod-Siverskyi, April 3/10, 1151 – the spring of 1201/December 29, 1202) was a Rus’ prince (a member of the Rurik dynasty). His baptismal name was Yury. Igor was prince of Putivl (1164–1180), of Novgorod-Seversk (1180–1198), and of Chernigov (1198–1201/1202).

Chronicle evidence reveals that he had an enviably successful military career; he led many campaigns against the Cumans from among which the chronicles report only one defeat. But it was his defeat at the river Kayala (the exact location of which has never been definitively established) that has become immortalized through its literary rendering in “The Lay of Igor’s Campaign”, the most celebrated epic of Rus’.

During his reign Novhorod-Siverskyi enjoyed the status of the second most powerful town in the Chernigov land. Basing their observations on archaeological evidence, a number of investigators proposed that Igor built the Cathedral of the Holy Savior in the Monastery of the Transfiguration outside of the town. It has also been suggested that he founded the stone church in Putivl.

To judge from circumstantial evidence, Igor's reign in Chernigov (now Chernihiv in modern Ukraine) was uneventful. He continued the family chronicle that his father and brother had commissioned.

His early life
Igor was the elder son of Svyatoslav Olgovich, by his second wife, the Novgorodian Catherine. By giving the child the baptismal name of Yury, Svyatoslav Olgovich acknowledged his friendship with prince Yury Vladimirovich of Suzdal. In choosing Igor for the boy's princely name, he testified to the close bond that had existed between him and his deceased brother.

When Sviatoslav died on February 15, 1164, Igor's older half-brother, Oleg Svyatoslavich, took over the control of Novgorod Severskiy and probably gave Putivl to Igor. Before 1170, Igor married a daughter of prince Yaroslav Volodymyrkovych Osmomysl of Halych.

Around June 1171, the Cumans renewed their raids along the Ros River and they attacked towns belonging to the Olgovichi (the ruling dynasty of Chernigov). Igor led a campaign against the invaders on June 29. After crossing the river Vorskla, he learnt that Khans Kobyak and Konchak were devastating districts around Pereyaslavl (now Pereiaslav in Ukraine); he crossed back over the river and rode to confront the raiders. On July 20, his druzhina killed many of the nomads and took others captive.

While returning from his victory, Igor visited the shrine of SS. Boris and Gleb in Vyshgorod (today Vyshhorod in Ukraine) to celebrate their feast. There he met with Roman I Rostislavich of Kiev (his brother-in-law) and his brothers on July 25. Their meeting was political in nature in that Igor would have pledged allegiance to the new ruler of Kiev.

Prince of Novgorod-Seversk

His half-brother, Oleg Sviatoslavich died on January 16, 1180; thus Igor left Putivl to succeed him in Novgorod Severskiy. Soon after Oleg Sviatoslavich's death, grand prince Sviatoslav III Vsevolodovich of Kiev summoned Igor and Igor's brother Vsevolod Svyatoslavich to Lyubech and concluded an agreement. Svyatoslav Vsevolodovich's main objective in assembling the senior generation of Olgovichi was to secure Igor's allegiance. On September 8, Svyatoslav Vsevolodovich ordered Igor and prince Vsevolod III Yuryevich of Vladimir to lead the junior Olgovichi and Monomashichi against Vyshgorod that he was besieging; the nine-week siege of the town became a failure.

At the beginning of 1181, Svyatoslav Vsevolodovich launched an expedition against Vsevolod Yuryevich in order to free from captivity his son Gleb Svyatoslavich (Prince of Chernigov). Before setting out, the grand prince commanded his son Yaroslav Svyatoslavich and Igor to remain behind and defend Chernigov against the Rostislavichi (the members of the ruling dynasty of Smolensk). Later, Yaroslav Svyatoslavich and Igor waged war on the Principality of Drutsk whose prince Gleb Rogvoldovich formed a pact with prince David Rostislavich of Smolensk. Although David Rostislavich came to assist the prince of Drutsk, but Svyatoslav Vsevolodovich, who had expanded his authority over Novgorod, made David Rostislavich flee from the field of battle and forced Gleb Rogvoldovich to capitulate.

From Drutsk, Svyatoslav Vsevolodovich traveled south to evict grand prince Rurik Rostislavich from the Kievan land. Meanwhile, Igor, accompanied by Khans Konchak and Kobyak, was waiting for him near Vyshgorod. After Svyatoslav Vsevolodovich occupied the capital, the Cumans asked him to let Igor accompany them to the Lake Dolobsk. When Ryurik Rostislavich learnt that Igor and the nomads were encamped on the other side of the Dnieper River, he sent troops to attack them. His troops defeated the Cumans; Igor and Khan Konchak, however, escaped by boat to Chernigov. It is likely that Igor and Khan Konchak formed a marriage alliance and arranged their children's engagement.

When Khan Konchak with his Donets Cumans pillaged the Pereyaslavl lands in February 1184, Sviatoslav Vsevolodovich sent his sons and his troops to Igor ordering him to pursue the tribesmen. Sviatoslav Vsevolodovich's co-ruler, Rurik Rostislavich, for his part, sent his troops under the command of prince Vladimir Glebovich of Pereyaslavl. Igor was appointed to command all the troops of the Olgovichi, and he refused Vladimir Glebovich permission to spearhead the attack, because the vanguard contingent would get the first chance to grab the booty. Shortly afterwards, Vladimir Glebovich pillaged the Seversk towns of the Olgovichi and rode off in a huff; Igor also sent the Kievan troops home. Consequently, Igor went in pursuit of the Cumans with a greatly diminished force, including some Black Hats. Igor pursued the raiders, found them at the river Khiriya (a tributary of the Vorskla), and took many captive. On his way home, he probably attacked Vladimir Glebovich's town of Glebov (on the right bank of the Trubizh River).

In the summer, grand prince Sviatoslav Vsevolodovich launched a major campaign against the Cumans; Igor proposed that Sviatoslav Vsevolodovich take the route across the Pereyaslavl lands and he would meet him at the river Sula. But Svyatoslav Vsevolodovich rejected his proposal, and therefore Igor boycotted the expedition. However, on learning that Sviatoslav Vsevolodovich's troops had departed, he also summoned his relatives; his aim was to plunder Cuman camps while the nomads were preoccupied fighting Sviatoslav Vsevolodovich's forces. Anticipating no opposition, Igor was surprised to chance upon a Cuman raiding party of 400 strong around the river Merla (south of the Khiriya) which gave his men an opportunity to win glory in the battle.

In 1184, Igor harbored Vladimir Yaroslavich (his brother-in-law) who had been driven out of Halych by his own father.

When Khan Konchak attacked again Rus’ with a large force in 1185, Sviatoslav Vsevolodovich and Ryurik Rostislavich quickly assembled a force. The chronicler claims that Igor was also eager to attack him even against the advice of his druzhinniki and adverse weather conditions prevented his departure.

His campaign and its aftermath

Later, on April 13, 1185, Igor, with some other junior princes, undertook a daring raid against the nomads with the object of reaching the Lower Don area. After the princes joined forces at the Oskol River, a band of Cumans spotted them and sent horsemen to warn the neighboring camps. When Igor arrived at the river Salnitsa, his scouts informed him that they had spotted the enemy in battle array. They advised him either to attack quickly before the Cuman band received reinforcements or to withdraw. Igor and his relatives refused to return home, because, they argued, their peers would mock them for fearing to face death and heap shame upon them.

As Igor's forces came to the river Syuurliy, the enemy archers shot a volley of arrows at them and withdrew. Igor and his brother prince Vsevolod Svyatoslavich of Trubetsk advanced in formation at a steady pace, but his nephew Svyatoslav Olgovich of Rylsk and his son Vladimir Igorevich set off in pursuit and defeated the nomads. After all the contingents had reassembled, Igor advised that they withdraw under the cover of darkness because they had seen how great a force the Cumans had already mustered. But Svyatoslav Olgovich pointed out that he had pursued the Cumans over a great distance and that his horses were too exhausted to set off immediately; therefore Igor ordered his troops to rest for the night.

Alarmed at the audacity of the princes to come to their very lairs, the Donets Cumans sounded a general alarm; for three days enemy archers shot arrows at them without engaging them in battle. The princes’ only hope lay in reaching the river Donets; if they fled, however, it meant deserting the common soldiers, and therefore they rode against the enemy. The raid ended in catastrophe: the Cumans surrounded Igor's forces like an unyielding wall so that only fifteen of the Rus’ men escaped. Igor was seized by a Cuman called Chilbuk but later Khan Konchak assumed responsibility for his svat (his son-in-law's father) Igor who had been wounded.

After learning of Igor's defeat Svyatoslav Vsevolodovich sent his two sons Vladimir  and Oleg to the Poseme region (along the Seym River) to serve as interim defenders of the Seversk towns. According to the chronicler, the Cumans assembled their entire nation to march against Rus’. But the khans argued: Koza suggested that they should raid the towns of the defeated princes along the river Seym; Konchak proposed attacking the princes on the Kievan side. Because the khans obstinately stuck to their views, they split their horde into two. Koza attacked Putivl but failed to take it; nevertheless, he set fire to its outer town, pillaged the district, and razed surrounding villages.

Meanwhile, Igor was spending his captivity in Konchak's camp. Although twenty Cumans were appointed to guard him, he was free to ride wherever he chose and to hunt with hawks. We are told that a Cuman offered to help him to escape; one day at dusk, he raised the tent flap and crawled out while the guards were entertaining themselves with games. 
After crossing over to the other side of the river Tor, Igor rode away. He traveled eleven days to the town Donets; from there he went to Novgorod Severskiy. We are not told when Igor escaped, but he could not have been in captivity for more than a few months; he probably fled in the late summer at the latest.

After arriving in Novgorod Severskiy, Igor visited Yaroslav II Vsevolodovich (his cousin) in Chernigov and asked for military aid. Next, he went to Svyatoslav Vsevolodovich in Kiev, and he undoubtedly asked him to assist in collecting the ransoms for the three captive princes. After leaving Svyatoslav, he visited Ryurik Rostislavich. Archaeological evidence suggests that after returning to Novgorod Severskiy, Igor reinforced the fortifications and founded new ones in the vicinity of Vyr.

Marriage alliances
In 1187, Igor reconciled his brother-in-law (Vladimir Yaroslavich) and father-in-law (prince Yaroslav Volodymyrkovych of Halych), and dispatched his son Svyatoslav Igorevich to escort Vladimir Yaroslavich home. In the autumn of 1188, his son Vladimir Igorevich returned home from captivity with Khan Konchak's daughter.

On September 26, 1188, Igor and his family attended the festivities organized by Rurik Rostislavich to celebrate his son's wedding. During the same week, Rurik Rostislavich gave away his daughter to Igor's son Svyatoslav.

In 1190, grand prince Svyatoslav Vsevolodovich married his grandson David Olgovich to Igor's daughter.

Svyatoslav Vsevolodovich died during the last week of July 1194, and his death changed the order of seniority among the Olgovichi: his only brother, Yaroslav Vsevolodovich became the new senior prince of the dynasty, and Igor became the second in seniority in the family.

Prince of Chernigov
On an unspecified date in 1198, prince Yaroslav Vsevolodovich died, and Igor succeeded him on the throne of Chernigov. One of his first tasks was to renew the alliances that Yaroslav Vsevolodovich had concluded with Roman Mstislavich of Vladimir-in-Volhynia; he also endorsed the alliances Yaroslav Vsevolodovich had made with Vsevolod III Yuryevich of Vladimir and the Rostislavichi.

The same year, his brother-in-law, prince Vladimir Yaroslavich of Halych died, and his death created a political vacuum. Although, the Olgovichi could argue that their marriage ties with his dynasty gave them the right to rule Halych, however, Roman Mstislavich was the quickest off the mark and he captured Halych.

When he died, as the prince of Chernigov, Igor merited burial in the Cathedral of Holy Saviour.

In the arts
On his campaign against the Cumans, a heroic poem was written which is the peak of Russian Bylinas. As a matter of fact, scholars still argue as to whether the Lay of Igor’s Campaign is written in verse or in rhythmic prose; in either case, it is poetry at its height and its language is racy and powerful. Besides rhythm, the poetic elements of the Lay comprise an extremely rich imagery constructed primarily on parallels with nature, symbolism, poetic address, and lyric lamentation.

In 1869, Vladimir Stasov, a major literary figure of 19th-century Russia, suggested to Alexander Borodin that an opera might be written on the subject of the Lay of Igor’s Campaign. Borodin began to write his Prince Igor but he left the opera unfinished at the time of his death nearly twenty years later. It fell to Nikolai Rimsky-Korsakov and Alexander Glazunov to finish the orchestration and prepare Prince Igor for publication and performance in 1890.

Marriage and children
#before 1170: Unnamed (Evfrosinia) Yaroslavna, the second daughter of prince Yaroslav Volodymyrkovych of Halych by his first wife Olga Yuryevna of Kiev
Prince Vladimir Igorevich of Halych (October 8, 1170 – 1211 or after)
Unnamed Igorevna (1171/1173 – after 1196), wife of David Olegovich
Oleg Igorevich (end of 1174 – after 1183) died at an early age
Prince Svyatoslav III Igorevich of Vladimir-in-Volhynia (1176 – September, 1211)
Prince Roman II Igorevich of Halych (1177/1179 – September, 1211)

Ancestors

See also
Prince Igor
Cuman people
Battle of Kalka River
Solar eclipse of 1 May 1185
The Lay of Igor's Campaign

Footnotes

Sources
Dimnik, Martin: The Dynasty of Chernigov - 1146-1246; Cambridge University Press, 2003, Cambridge; .
Jellinek, George: History through the Opera Glass: From the Rise of Caesar to the Fall of Napoleon; Proscenium Publishers Inc., 2000, New York; .
Vernadsky, George: Kievan Russia; Yale University Press, 1948, New Haven and London; .
Zenkovsky, Serge A.: Medieval Russia’s Epics, Chronicles and Tales; Penguin Group, 1974; .
Dimnik, Martin. Battle of Kayala River (1185).The Encyclopedia of War 2011
Anatoly Vorony. In Search of the River Kayala. Day, Kiev. 12 December, 2000
Alexander IlYIN. SECRET OF THE BATTLE ON THE KAYALA RIVER. «VREMYA», Tuesday March 13 2001

1151 births
1200s deaths
Olgovichi family
Princes of Novgorod-Seversk
Princes of Chernigov
Eastern Orthodox monarchs
The Tale of Igor's Campaign